Tundra is a treeless region near the poles of the Earth or at high elevations.

Tundra may refer to:

Dream Tundra, kit aircraft 
Joplin Tundra, ultralight aircraft
"The Mighty Boosh (series 1)" contains an episode named "Tundra"
Toyota Tundra, A full-size pickup truck manufactured by Toyota since May 1999
Tundra (comic strip), a comic strip by Chad Carpenter
Tundra (Marvel Comics), one of the Great Beasts supervillains featured in the Marvel Comics series Alpha Flight
Tundra (musician) (born 1975), a musician from Norway
Tundra Books, a Canadian children's book publisher
Tundra orbit, a highly elliptical, highly inclined geosynchronous orbit
Tundra Publishing, a defunct American comic book publisher
Tundra Semiconductor, a semiconductor company in Canada
Tundra (satellite), a type of Russian military satellites
Tundra (album)
Tundra (1936 film), American film directed by Norman Dawn
Tundra (2021 film), Cuban film directed by 	José Luis Aparicio
"Tundra", a song by Squarepusher from the 1996 album Feed Me Weird Things